The 1954 Icelandic Basketball Tournament was the 3rd season of the top tier men's basketball league in Iceland. The season started on April 26, 1954 and ended on April 28, 1954. ÍR won its first title by posting the best record in the league.

Competition format
The participating teams played each other once for a total of 2 games. The top team won the national championship.

Results

Notes

Regular season

References

External links
Official Icelandic Basketball Federation website

Lea
Úrvalsdeild karla (basketball)